By 1700 Sweden was the dominant power in Northern Europe, controlling territory from Norway to modern day St Petersburg. But from all sides it was attacked by several countries, Norway to the West, Russia in the East, Poland to the South-East, and Saxony to the south. The countries formed a coalition against Sweden and surprise attacked from all sides. By 1721, Sweden had been forced to sign a humiliating peace, giving up Swedish Livonia and losing all their power.

This list shows the list of the military engagements using the Julian calendar, Swedish calendar and the Gregorian calendar.

References

    

Battles of the Great Northern War